Lászlo Sólyom (born November 29, 1955) is an ethnic Hungarian former ice hockey player in Romania. He played for the Romania men's national ice hockey team at the 1980 Winter Olympics in Lake Placid.

References

1955 births
Living people
Ice hockey players at the 1980 Winter Olympics
Olympic ice hockey players of Romania
People from Gheorgheni
Romanian ice hockey centres
Romanian sportspeople of Hungarian descent